Zoos Bank was Mongolia's sixth largest privately owned commercial bank. It was delisted on the 6th of April 2021.

Company Profile

Since it was founded in May 1999, Zoos Bank provided commercial banking services and appointed an American national as its CEO in July, 2009. Mr. Benjamin Turnbull, well experienced in Mongolian banking, was appointed by The Governing Board of the bank and European Bank for Reconstruction and Development (EBRD) which was the major stakeholder of the bank owning 25 percent plus one share. Zoos Bank had loaned MNT 60 billion to Mongol Gazar Holdings which later caused financial difficulties. The Governor of Mongol Bank (Central Bank), Mr. Purevdorj announced the Government's decision to take over Zoos Bank after receiving its request to merge with the Savings Bank of Mongolia. It was finally delisted several years later.

References 
1. http://ubpost.mongolnews.mn/index.php?option=com_content&task=view&id=4064&Itemid=36 
2. https://web.archive.org/web/20091124095752/http://en.news.mn/news/3948

External links 

Banks of Mongolia